Changqing Subdistrict is a subdistrict in Louxing Districtof Loudi City, Hunan Province, People's Republic of China.

Administrative division
The subdistrict is divided into 9 communities, the following areas: 
 Zhushan Community
 Guanjia Community
 Gengtang Community
 Louxing Community
 Xiaohua Community
 Dongxin Community
 Changqing Community
 Fuqing Community
 Ganzichong Community

Geography
Lianshui River, also known as the mother river, flows through the subdistrict.

Economy
The local economy is primarily based upon commerce and local industry.

Hospital
The Loudi Central Hospital is situated at the subdistrict. The Chinese Medicine Hospital of Loudi is also sits in the subdistrict.

Education

Hunan University of Humanities, Science and Technology is a state-owned provincial university in the subdistrict.

Transportation

Railway
The Luoyang–Zhanjiang Railway, from Luoyang City, Henan Province to Zhanjiang City, Guangdong Province runs through the subdistrict.

The Shanghai–Kunming railway, more commonly known as "Hukun railway", is a west-east railway passing through the subdistrict.

Attractions
Three public parks are located in the town: Shima Park, Zhushan Park and Xiannüzhai Ecological Park.

References

External links

Divisions of Louxing District